The Duquesne Dukes women's basketball team represent Duquesne University, located in Pittsburgh, Pennsylvania in NCAA Division I basketball competition. They play in the Atlantic 10 Conference

History
Duquesne started play in 1974, joining Division I and the Atlantic 10 in 1984. As of the end of the 2015–16 season, the Dukes have an all-time record of 561–578, with a Division I record of 457–507. They have made the NCAA Tournament once and they have made the WNIT seven times.

References

External links